Tel Saki ( / ALA-LC: Tel Al-Saki) is a dormant volcanic hill in the southeastern part of the Golan Heights. It extends to an elevation of 594 meters above sea level.

The hill is a part of a chain of dormant volcanic mountains spanning along the eastern part of the Golan Heights starting from Mount Ram in the north and ending on Tel Saki in the South.

References

Golan Heights
Landforms of the Golan Heights
Mountains of the Golan Heights
International mountains of Asia